This is a list of notable painters from, or associated with, Luxembourg.

B
Pierre Brandebourg (1824–1878)

D
Max Dauphin (born 1977)

E
Michel Engels (1851–1901)

F
Jean-Baptiste Fresez (1800–1867)

G
Gust Graas (1924–2020)

J
Jean Jacoby (1891–1936)

K
Théo Kerg (1909–1993)
Will Kesseler (1899–1983)
Emile Kirscht (1913–1994)
Nico Klopp (1894–1930)
Max Kohn (born 1954)
Joseph Kutter (1894–1941)

L
Dominique Lang (1874–1919)
Nicolas Liez (1809–1892)

M
Michel Majerus (1967–2002)

P
Joseph Probst (1911–1997)

R
Harry Rabinger (1895–1966)

S
Frantz Seimetz (1858–1934)
Michel Stoffel (1903–1963)

T
Foni Tissen (1909–1975)

W
Sosthène Weis (1872–1941)

See also
List of artists from Luxembourg

Luxembourgian painters
Luxembourgian painters
Painters